Shane Company or Shane Co. is the largest privately owned jeweler in the United States. The company is a direct diamond, ruby, and sapphire importer that operates 20 retail stores across the US, as well as their website, ShaneCo.com. The company was founded in 1971, and is based in Denver, Colorado.

The company promotes their retail locations and website through radio commercials that prominently feature the company’s CEO Tom Shane and the tagline "Now you have a friend in the jewelry business."

History
Tom Shane graduated from the University of Colorado in 1970 with a degree in business administration. In 1971, he founded modern-day Shane Company, although his family has been in the jewelry business since the Great Depression. His grandfather, Charles Shane, launched the family into the jewelry business in 1929 when he purchased his first jewelry store in Cleveland, Ohio. Richard Shane, Tom Shane's father, joined his father and brother, Claude Shane, in the business after World War II.  Several years afterward, Richard and Claude split their business interests into two large jewelry chains in the Midwest, opening the first stores with the name Shane Company. Throughout the following decades, Tom Shane grew Shane Co. from a one-store operation into a jewelry store chain with 21 locations in 13 states.

Bankruptcy
Shane Company filed for Chapter 11 bankruptcy on January 12, 2009 and closed three locations in Orlando, Florida; Morrow, Georgia; and Tukwila, Washington, on February 15, 2009.

On August 11, 2010, Shane Co. filed a Plan of Reorganization to repay 100% of all debts, placing debts to Tom Shane as the lowest priority. The bankruptcy judge called it "the ideal Chapter 11". On December 21, 2010, Shane Co. emerged from Chapter 11 bankruptcy protection.

In popular culture
Tom Shane was depicted in an episode of South Park. The episode, titled "Guitar Queer-o", originally aired on November 7, 2007. He was portrayed at a party among notable local Colorado celebrities such as Jake Jabs from American Furniture Warehouse, and Jay Cutler, former quarterback of the Denver Broncos.

Shane Co. is known for their radio advertisements. A typical radio advertisement will contain a marketing message and the often quoted culmination of the spot, the company’s tagline, “Now you have a friend in the diamond business.”

The company has aggressively defended the tagline. The tagline and Tom Shane's delivery have been the subject of humor; the Atlanta Business Chronicle noted, "the ads have all the flash and flare of a public service announcement", remarking on his "relentlessly earnest tone". The San Francisco Chronicle said, "for the past 35 years, Shane has bored radio listeners with his earnest, monotone delivery".
The company states the radio advertisements are the longest-running continuous campaign in the history of the medium of radio. The commercials were freshened up with the help of the Grey Global Group advertising agency, which used the tagline "He might be dull, but he's brilliant" in 2006. The commercials remain a cornerstone of the company's advertising efforts to this day.

References

External links
 

1971 establishments in Colorado
Online jewelry retailers of the United States
American companies established in 1971
Retail companies established in 1971
Companies based in Denver
Companies that filed for Chapter 11 bankruptcy in 2009